is a Japanese master of Shotokan karate.
He has won the JKA's version of the world championships for kata. He has also won the JKA All-Japan championships for kata on 2 occasions and for kumite on 3 occasions.
He is currently an instructor of the Japan Karate Association.

Biography

Katsutoshi Shiina was born in Tokyo, Japan on 21 November 1961. He studied at Takushoku University. His karate training began during his 5th year of elementary school.

Competition
Katsutoshi Shiina has had considerable success in karate competition.

Major Tournament Success
9th Shoto World Cup Karate Championship Tournament (Tokyo, 2004) - 1st Place Kata
47th JKA All Japan Karate Championship (2004) - 1st Place Kata
45th JKA All Japan Karate Championship (2002) - 2nd Place Kata; 3rd Place Kumite
44th JKA All Japan Karate Championship (2001) - 1st Place Kata
8th Shoto World Cup Karate Championship Tournament (Tokyo, 2000) - 3rd Place Kata
43rd JKA All Japan Karate Championship (2000) - 2nd Place Kumite; 3rd Place Kata
39th JKA All Japan Karate Championship (1996) - 3rd Place Kumite
38th JKA All Japan Karate Championship (1995) - 3rd Place Kumite
37th JKA All Japan Karate Championship (1994) - 1st Place Kumite
5th Shoto World Cup Karate Championship Tournament - 3rd Place Kumite
36th JKA All Japan Karate Championship (1993) - 1st Place Kumite
34th JKA All Japan Karate Championship (1991) - 1st Place Kumite
33rd JKA All Japan Karate Championship (1990) - 3rd Place Kumite
30th JKA All Japan Karate Championship (1987) - 2nd Place Kumite

References

 

1961 births
Japanese male karateka
Karate coaches
Shotokan practitioners
Sportspeople from Tokyo
Takushoku University alumni
Living people